A log-linear model is a mathematical model that takes the form of a function whose logarithm equals a linear combination of the parameters of the model, which makes it possible to apply (possibly multivariate) linear regression. That is, it has the general form
,

The term may specifically be used for:
A log-linear plot or graph, which is a type of semi-log plot.
Poisson regression for contingency tables, a type of generalized linear model.

The specific applications of log-linear models are where the output quantity lies in the range 0 to ∞, for values of the independent variables ,  or more immediately, the transformed quantities   in the range −∞ to +∞. This may be contrasted to logistic models, similar to the logistic function, for which the output quantity lies in the range 0 to 1. Thus the contexts where these models are useful or realistic often depends on the range of the values being modelled.

See also
Log-linear analysis
General linear model
Generalized linear model
Boltzmann distribution
Elasticity

Further reading